Chishang railway station is a railway station located in Chishang Township, Taitung County, Taiwan. It is located on the Taitung line and is operated by the Taiwan Railways Administration.

Around the station
 Dapo Pond
 Wu Tao Chishang Lunch Box Cultural History Museum

References

1924 establishments in Taiwan
Railway stations opened in 1924
Railway stations in Taitung County
Railway stations served by Taiwan Railways Administration